This is a list of all of the islands of Kiribati. The Republic of Kiribati consists of 32   atolls and one raised coral island. These islands are dispersed throughout the three island groups that form Kiribati: 
the Gilbert, 
Phoenix,
and Line islands.
All but one island, sparsely populated Canton Island, in the Phoenix group are uninhabited. The remaining Phoenix Islands make up the Phoenix Islands Marine Protected Area, which is the third largest marine protected area in the world.

The table includes area  and population data.

Gilbert Islands 

{| class="wikitable sortable"  style="width:100%;"
! Image
! Island (Previous name)
! Landarea(km²)
! Lagoonarea(km²)
! Coordinates
! Type 
! Population  (2020)
|-

Line Islands 

{| class="wikitable sortable"  style="width:100%;"
! Image
! Island (Previous name)
! Landarea(km²)
! Lagoonarea(km²)
! Coordinates
! Type 
! Population  (2020)
|-

Phoenix Islands 

{| class="wikitable sortable"  style="width:100%;"
! Image
! Island (Previous name)
! Landarea(km²)
! Lagoonarea(km²)
! Coordinates
! Type 
! Population  (2020)
|-

West of the Gilberts 

{| class="wikitable sortable"  style="width:100%;"
! Image
! Island (Previous name)
! Landarea(km²)
! Lagoonarea(km²)
! Coordinates
! Type 
! Population  (2020)
|-

See also
ISO 3166-2:KI
Districts of Kiribati

References

Islands
 
 
Kiribati